Agriolimacidae is a family of small and medium-sized land slugs, or shell-less snails, terrestrial pulmonate gastropod mollusks.

Distribution 
Distribution of Limacidae is Holarctic, this include: Nearctic, western Palearctic and eastern Palearctic.

Agriolimacidae is the largest slug family, some are introduced all over the world, synanthropes are often severe pests.

Anatomy
Most slugs in the family Agriolimacidae are rather small; only a few (in the genera Mesolimax and Krynickillus) are larger. Most are not more than 50 mm long. The mantle is usually large, occupying approximately 1/3 of the entire body length, situated in the anterior part of the body. The pneumostome is clearly postmedial. The surface of the mantle in living slugs is covered in concentric, mobile wrinkles. In addition sometimes there is a shallow, poorly defined groove which runs above the pneumostome on the right side, not passing to the left.

The penis is short, usually bag-shaped, often with external appendages, inside with different stimulatory organs. No tubular membrane encircles the penis and vas deferens. The penis retractor muscle is situated beside the right tentacle.

In this family, the number of haploid chromosomes lies between 26 and 30 (according to the values in this table).

Taxonomy 
The following two subfamilies have been recognized in the taxonomy of Bouchet & Rocroi (2005):
 subfamily Agriolimacinae H. Wagner, 1935 - synonym: Deroceratinae Magne, 1952
 subfamily Mesolimacinae Hausdorf, 1998

Genera
Genera within the family Agriolimacidae include:

subfamily Agriolimacinae
 Deroceras Rafinesque, 1820 - type genus described as Agriolimax Mörch, 1865
 Furcopenis Castillejo & Wiktor, 1983
 Krynickillus Kaleniczenko, 1851

subfamily Mesolimacinae
 Mesolimax Pollonera, 1888
 Mesolimax brauni Pollonera, 1888

subfamily ?
 Lytopelte  Boettger, 1886
 Megalopelte  Lindholm, 1914

Cladogram 
A cladogram showing the phylogenic relationships of this family to other families within the limacoid clade:

References 
This article incorporates public domain text from the reference.

External links 

Slugs of Florida on the UF / IFAS Featured Creatures Web site